Om Namo Narayanaya, also referred to as the Ashtakshara (eight syllables), and the Narayana Mantra, is among the most popular mantras of Hinduism, and the principal mantra of Vaishnavism. It is an invocation addressed to Narayana, the god of preservation, the form of Vishnu who lays in eternal rest beneath the cosmic waters.

Origin 

In the Sama Veda, 'Om Namo Narayanaya' is said to have been taught by Vedic sages to the seekers who came to them for wisdom. It is traditionally believed that this mantra revealed its significance and meaning to these sages through their penances, after which they shared it with seekers as a means of self-realisation.

Literature 

Om Namo Narayanaya is heavily featured in Hindu literature, especially in the Upanishads and the Puranas. The mantra is often specified as being invoked by the characters of these scriptures to gain salvation from the deity, and as an instruction to the devotees of Narayana in the performance of rituals.

According to the Tarasara Upanishad, om is the divine sacred syllable that represents the nature of Brahman, the Ultimate Reality that is unchanging and eternal. Namo can be translated from Sanskrit as “to bow to” or “to pay homage to”, as well as refer to an individual's name. Narayanaya is a term that may be translated as "to or of Narayana". Nara refers to “water”, and anaya means “abode” or “shelter.” Narayana is an epithet of Vishnu, whose celestial realm is Vaikuntha, amid the cosmic waters of creation. Hence, it is a mantra that is associated with submission to God, accepting one's existence in the grand design, as well as seeking the protection of Vishnu.

The sage and philosopher Yajnavalkya provides an explanation of the breakdown of the components of the mantra:

In the Vaishnava Upanishads, the Samashti-Yantra, the words described over Ananta, the seat of Vishnu, bear the ashtakshara.

The Narada Purana furnishes the following details regarding the chanting of this mantra: If a man performs the japa of chanting the mantra in the banks of the river Ganga, he would achieve moksha.

The Narayana Upanishad also remarks upon the mantra, stating that one attains Vaikuntha by chanting it.

The mantra is also often associated with Prahlada, a daitya devotee of Narayana, and the son of Hiranyakashipu. Despite repeated instruction by his instructors to chant the invocation, "Hiranyaya namah" (glory to Hiranya), the devotee sticks to his favoured mantra, "Om Namo Narayanaya Namah" (glory to Narayana).

Historical usage 
Periyalvar, an Alvar, a poet-saint of the Sri Vaishnava tradition, invoked the mantra to convince the Pandya king of Madurai of the supremacy of Vishnu. He proclaimed that Narayana was the supreme deity, all-merciful and all-bountiful, and that he was the path towards the achievement of bliss.

Significance 

The mantra is held in supreme regard by the Vaishnavas, the adherents of Vishnu who make up the dominant denomination within Hinduism. The religious significance of chanting this incantation is described in the Tarasara Upanishad, stating that he who chants the mantra is purified by the deities Agni, Vayu, Surya, as well as Shiva. The merit attained by chanting it is described to be the equivalent of reciting the Itihasas, the Puranas, and all the mantras a hundred thousand times. It is also stated to be the equivalent of reciting the Gayatri mantra a hundred thousand times, and the syllable 'Om' ten thousand times. It is stated to be powerful enough to purify ten of one's immediate ancestors, and ten of one's immediate descendants. Finally, it states that the recitation of the mantra allows one to attain the state of union with Narayana.

The Linga Purana states that chanting the mantra is the means for achieving all objects, and hence must be invoked for every occasion.

In Sri Vaishnavism, the chanting of the mantra was part of the panchasamskaras of Ramanuja, the five sacraments that initiated him into the tradition by his guru, Periyanambi.

According to Vaishnava theology, it is held that whoever studies this ashtakshara of Narayana and recites it constantly attains a full life, supremacy over men, enjoys the pleasures of royalty, and becomes the master of all souls. Whoever chants this mantra is held to attain moksha, according to the teachings of the Sama Veda.

See also 

 Om Namo Bhagavate Vasudevaya
 Om Namah Shivaya
 Hare Krishna

References 

Vishnu
Vaishnavism
Vedas
Upanishadic concepts
Hindu mantras
Om mantras
Mantras